= Valley View Apartments =

Block of Buildings in United States

Coordinates: 44°8′52″N 93°59′20″W

Valley View Apartments (also known as Tornado Towers) was a block of buildings in Mankato, Minnesota, United States, constructed by placing mobile homes in a concrete frame, stacked four high.

The building was erected in the 1970s, and demolished in 1995.

The buildings were widely condemned as ugly, and were eventually bought by the city for $160,000 and demolished. They were replaced with more conventional apartments, of the same name.
